Sulfamethoxypyridazine is a sulfonamide antibacterial.

It is prescribed for vaginal irritation, and severe acute thrush.

It is also used in the treatment of Dermatitis herpetiformis, where it is an alternative therapy to Dapsone.

Sulfamethoxypyridazine is supplied as 500mg tablets.

References 

Sulfonamide antibiotics
Pyridazines